WDNN-CD, virtual channel 49 and UHF digital channel 20, is a low-powered,  Class A independent television station licensed to Dalton, Georgia, United States. WDNN is primarily viewed on local cable systems as Channel 10.

North Georgia Television also owns and operates Antenna TV affiliate WDGA-CD (virtual channel 43, UHF digital channel 47) in Dalton, Georgia. This station has now signed an affiliation agreement with Tribune Entertainment's Antenna TV network, as of October 24, 2018.  It is also now boosting its signal coverage area to cover more of Chattanooga, 30 miles northwest.

North Georgia Television also owned WTNB-CA in Cleveland, Tennessee until selling it to PTP Holdings in 2009; in 2005, WTNB and WDNN both offered similar schedules featuring FamilyNet and local programming, but WTNB produced its own local programming separate from WDNN and its repeaters. WDNN-CD was also repeated by LaFayette, Georgia's WLFW-LP (on channel 41) until February 16, 2017, when the Federal Communications Commission cancelled WLFW-LP's license.

History
WDNN started broadcasting in May 1989. The station was created to serve the community through locally produced programs. The staff initially consisted of Doug Jensen, Doug Smith, Sherry Wein and James Logan.

In the spring of 1993, WDNN started a daily newscast called NewsWatch 10. It was at that time that Calvin Means and three reporters joined the WDNN team. The station grew from being on one cable system to four systems that cover Northwest Georgia. WDNN then added WLFW, WRNG, and WDGA to broadcast their programs over the air.

Programming
WDNN's programming primarily consists of family programming. The station carries local programming daily including a local news and sportscast, religious programs on Sundays, and children's programs on Saturday mornings.

Digital channels
The station's digital signal is multiplexed:

References

External links

Independent television stations in the United States
Retro TV affiliates
DNN-CD
Television channels and stations established in 1994
Low-power television stations in the United States
NewsNet affiliates